Prateeksha ( Waiting) is a 1993 Indian Hindi-language action film, Produced by S. Ramanathan under the Raam Raj Kala Mandhir banner and directed by Lawrence D'Souza. It stars Jeetendra, Moushumi Chatterjee, Govinda, Shilpa Shirodkar with music composed by Rajesh Roshan.

Plot
Vijay is a very talented dancer conducts programs along with his wife Laxmi and a friend Tom D’Costa. Once, a malignant business man Dinesh Khanna learns about them who ploy, by organizing Vijay’s show in London and tries to molest Laxmi. Fortunately, Vijay returns, gets killed by Dinesh while protecting Laxmi and Tom becomes crippled in that catastrophe. Laxmi is panelled for crime leaving her son Raja alone. Years roll by, and Raja strives hard to sustain the skill gifted by his parents as street dancer. Meanwhile, Laxmi is released and they also find Tom as a street beggar and start their troupe. Accordingly, an organizer spots Raja and enrolls him in a competition where he triumphs. He also challenges a naughty girl Renu which turns into mutual love. Soon, Raja summits the sky, despite, the homicide of his father haunting him but unable to recall his face. Stunningly, Renu is the daughter of Dinesh. Nevertheless, Laxmi quiets as it may make Raja a hit man. Being cognizant of it, frenzied Dinesh conspires to eliminate Raja, but tragically, Tom dies while guarding him. At last, Laxmi affirms the actuality and Raja ceases Dinesh. Finally, the movie ends on a happy note with Raja continuing his musical journey.

Cast
 Jeetendra as Vijay Kumar
 Moushumi Chatterjee as Laxmi V Kumar
 Govinda as  Raja V Kumar
 Shilpa Shirodkar as Renu Khanna
 Vinod Mehra as Tom D'Costa
 Danny Denzongpa as Dinesh Khanna
 Tej Sapru as Pratap
 Vikas Anand as Anand
 Master Bunty as Young Raja

Soundtrack

References

External links

1990s Hindi-language films
1993 films
Films scored by Rajesh Roshan
Films directed by Lawrence D'Souza